Csaba Szilvay (born 1941) is a Finnish cellist, teacher and conductor. He was born in Budapest, Hungary. He is the brother of the violinist Géza Szilvay and the uncle of the violinist Réka Szilvay. With his brother Géza Szilvay he founded the Helsinki Strings, a youth orchestra, in 1972. They conducted it until they retired in 2010.

References

1941 births
Living people
Hungarian conductors (music)
Male conductors (music)
Knights of the Order of the Lion of Finland
21st-century conductors (music)
Hungarian expatriates in Finland
21st-century Hungarian male musicians